Legion Simferopol is an ice hockey team in Simferopol, Ukraine. The club was founded in 2008, and played in Division B (South) of the Vyscha Liha during the 2009-10 season. They finished in third and last place in the group, with a record of two wins and six losses, with 37 goals for and 63 against.

References

External links
Team profile on hockeyarenas.net
Team profile on eurohockey.com

Ice hockey teams in Ukraine
Sport in Simferopol
2008 establishments in Ukraine
Ice hockey clubs established in 2008